Christmas Party is the 13th and final album by The Monkees, released on October 12, 2018. Produced mainly by Adam Schlesinger (with Michael Nesmith's tracks produced by his sons Christian and Jonathan), the album is the Monkees' first to focus on Christmas themes. It follows on the success of their 2016 album Good Times! The two-year gap is the shortest between albums since the 1969/1970 releases of The Monkees Present and Changes. The album features surviving Monkees Micky Dolenz, Mike Nesmith, and Peter Tork, as well as two posthumous contributions from Davy Jones. It is the final Monkees studio album to be released prior to Tork and Nesmith's deaths in 2019 and 2021, respectively.

The album features a mix of covers of earlier Christmas songs (from "Angels We Have Heard on High" and "Wonderful Christmastime" to the relatively obscure "Jesus Christ" originally by Big Star) and new holiday tunes written specifically for the album by several Good Times! contributors, including XTC's Andy Partridge, Weezer's Rivers Cuomo and Schlesinger. This is the only Monkees album on which there are no songs written by any member of The Monkees.  

The Target store exclusive version features two additional tracks, "Riu Chiu" and "Christmas Is My Time of Year," vintage recordings from the group remastered and remixed by original Monkees producer Chip Douglas.

Cover
The album cover was illustrated by comics artist Michael Allred. Allred, a lifetime Monkees fan, recalled: "I can't even remember doing it now. I was on a crazy high trying to squeeze everything I could into it."

Reception

Christmas Party received a mixed review in The Guardian, who described it as "a curious hodgepodge" and gave it three out of five stars. The same score was given by The Arts Desk who described it as "a mixed bag of covers and original songs and some of it is a bit cheesy". The Los Angeles Times gave the album two and a half out of four stars, stating "the big calling card may well be two vocals that Davy Jones recorded in 1991 and that are newly outfitted in fresh instrumental accompaniment pulled together by album producer Adam Schlesinger."
 
Variety did not rate the album, but described it as feeling "mostly like a Micky Dolenz solo album — co-produced by Fountains of Wayne’s Adam Schlesinger — that happens to have a few odd interjections from Michael Nesmith, Peter Tork and, yes, the late Davy Jones."

Track listing

Personnel
Partial credits sourced from track listing and Monkees Live Almanac.
Micky Dolenz: lead vocals on "Unwrap You at Christmas", "What Would Santa Do", "House of Broken Gingerbread", "Christmas Party", "Jesus Christ", "I Wish It Could Be Christmas Everyday", "Wonderful Christmastime", "Merry Christmas, Baby"; co-lead vocals on “Christmas Is My Time of Year”; vocals on "Riu Chiu"; spoken vocals on "Christmas Party"
Michael Nesmith: lead vocals on "The Christmas Song" and "Snowfall"; vocals on "Riu Chiu"; spoken vocals on "Christmas Party"
Peter Tork: lead vocals on "Angels We Have Heard on High”, vocals on “Riu Chiu”; spoken vocals on "Christmas Party"; banjo on "Angels We Have Heard on High"; Hammond organ on “Christmas Is My Time of Year”
Davy Jones: lead vocals on "Mele Kelikimaka" and "Silver Bells"; vocals on “Riu Chiu”; co-lead vocals on “Christmas Is My Time of Year”; spoken vocals on "Christmas Party" 
Adam Schlesinger: bass on "Unwrap You at Christmas", "What Would Santa Do", "Mele Kelikimaka", "House of Broken Gingerbread", "Christmas Party", "Jesus Christ", "I Wish It Could Be Christmas Everyday", "Silver Bells", "Wonderful Christmastime", "Merry Christmas, Baby"; keyboards on "What Would Santa Do", "House of Broken Gingerbread", "Christmas Party", "Jesus Christ", "Wonderful Christmastime"; piano on "Christmas Party", "Jesus Christ", "I Wish It Could Be Christmas Everyday"
Brian Young: drums
Jody Porter: guitar
Peter Buck: guitar
David Mead: backing vocals
Christian Nesmith: guitar, keyboards
Jonathan Nesmith: instruments, backing vocals on "Snowfall"
Chip Douglas: bass, guitar and production on “Christmas Is My Time of Year”
Eddie Hoh: drums on “Christmas Is My Time of Year”

Charts

References

The Monkees albums
2018 Christmas albums
Christmas albums by American artists
Pop rock Christmas albums
Rhino Records albums
Albums produced by Adam Schlesinger